Bačiulis is a Lithuanian language family name. It may refer to:
Irena Bačiulytė (born 1939), Lithuanian rower
Vidmantas Bačiulis, Lithuanian screenwriter, film and TV film director

Lithuanian-language surnames